WBGZ (1570 AM) is a radio station licensed to Alton, Illinois. The station carries a talk radio format. The station has been broadcasting for almost 75 years. The station also broadcasts on translator W296DR 107.1 in Alton.

History
WOKZ began broadcasting Wednesday, Feb. 4, 1948. Studios were located in the Stratford Hotel in downtown Alton. It was owned by the Illinois-Alton Broadcasting Company.

References

External links
WBGZ official website

BGZ
News and talk radio stations in the United States